Libby Sharpe (born 27 November 1991) is an Australian football (soccer) player currently playing for Newcastle United Jets.

Sharpe represented NSW at ten years of age and in 2007 played in the Australian under 17s side. She plays in the full-back position.

External links 
 Newcastle Jets Profile

References 

Australian women's soccer players
Living people
Newcastle Jets FC (A-League Women) players
1991 births
Women's association football defenders